The White Rock may refer to:
The White Rock: An Exploration of the Inca Heartland , 2001 travel book by Hugh Thomson  
The White Rock (novel), 1945 novel by Denys Val Baker

See also
White Rock (disambiguation)